
Mount Igikpak (Iñupiaq: Iġġiqpak) is the highest peak in the Schwatka Mountains region of the Brooks Range. It is also the tallest mountain in Gates of the Arctic National Park, located in the US state of Alaska. Some sources list the height of its summit at 8,510'. Mount Igikpak is in the south central part of the national park, very close to the source of the Noatak River and not far from the Arrigetch Peaks. Its name comes from the Iñupiaq word Iġġiqpak, meaning 'big mountain'.

Climbing History 
The first ascent of Mount Igikpak was completed August 9, 1968 by David Roberts, Chuck Loucks, and Al De Maria.

See also

List of mountain peaks of North America
List of mountain peaks of the United States
List of mountain peaks of Alaska
List of Ultras of the United States

References

External links

 

Mountains of Alaska
Mountains of Northwest Arctic Borough, Alaska
Highest points of United States national parks
Gates of the Arctic National Park and Preserve
Brooks Range